The 2013–14 season was Preston North End's 126th year in the Football League and their third consecutive season in the third division of English football, Football League One.

Season overview
In Simon Grayson's first summer in charge, he permanently signed 4 players, Tom Clarke, a centreback, Chris Humphrey, a right winger, Kevin Davies, a Centre forward and Alex Nicholson, a right back. He also signed Declan Rudd on a season long loan from Norwich City. He allowed 3 players to leave during the summer, those being Luke Foster, Chris Robertson and Andrew Procter.

The 2013–14 season started off well, unbeaten in their first 9 league games. They also beat local rivals Blackpool in the League Cup, before being beaten by Lancashire rivals Burnley in the second round.

The 9 league game unbeaten run came to an end on 5 October, against Peterborough United, a 2–0 defeat and was followed up with another 2–0 defeat, against Crewe. Preston then went on another 9 game unbeaten league run, winning 5 and drawing 4, including a win against Leyton Orient, only their second league defeat of the season. The unbeaten run came to an end after a 3–0 home defeat to Brentford, but was followed up with 3 more consecutive wins, against Carlisle United, Shrewsbury Town and Port Vale.

Preston's FA Cup campaign started off successfully, with a 6–0 win over Barnet in the first round. That was followed up with a 1–0 over Wycombe Wanderers.

Preston's 2nd game of 2014 was against Wolves, which ended in a 2–0 defeat. In the FA Cup, Preston came up against Ipswich Town in the 3rd round of the FA Cup, drawing 1–1, before winning 3–2 in the replay. In the Fourth Round of the FA Cup, Preston were drawn against Nottingham Forest. They drew 0–0 before Preston lost 0–2 in the replay.

Following that loss, Preston then went onto a 12-game unbeaten run in the league, their 3rd of the season, which strengthened North End's position in the play off positions, placing them 17 points ahead of 7th placed M.K. Dons, with 27 points available. The unbeaten run was then lost after a 1–0 defeat by Swindon Town, but was followed up with two consecutive wins against Peterborough United and Crawley Town, which all but secured their play off place, being 18 points clear of M.K. Dons, with 18 points to play for. The next game was a 1–1 draw with Bristol City followed up with a 6–1 romp against Carlisle United.

Preston won two and lost two of their final four league games of the season. They lost 1–0 to Brentford Preston then went on to beat Shrewsbury Town and Gillingham, moving them up to 3rd place. The final game of the season was against Crewe, which they lost 2–1, meaning they ended the season in 5th place.

The result meant that Preston would face Rotherham United in the League One play-offs. The first leg ended in a 1–1 draw after top scorer Joe Garner produced a breathtaking equaliser for the home side. In the second leg, Preston took an early lead through Paul Gallagher, but went on to concede 3 goals; losing 3–1 on the night and 4–2 on aggregate.

League One Data

League table

Result summary

Result by round

Kits

|
|

Squad

Statistics

|-
|colspan=14|Players currently out on loan:

|-
|colspan=14|Players who have left the club:

|}

Play-offs statistics

|}

Captains

Goals record

Disciplinary record

Suspensions served

Contracts

Transfers

In

Loans in

Out

Loans out

Fixtures and results

Pre-season

League One

League One play-offs

FA Cup

League Cup

League Trophy

Overall summary

Summary

Score overview

References

Preston North End F.C. seasons
Preston North End